Andadu Aagadu (translation: He Can Not Be Caught and He Does Not Stop) is a 1979 Telugu spy thriller film directed by S. D. Lal and produced by Shrikant Nahata under Shrikant Pictures. The film stars Krishnam Raju and Latha Sethupathi in the lead roles. The film has music composed by Chellapilla Satyam. The film is a remake of the 1973 Bollywood film, Keemat starring Dharmendra and Rekha. Krishnam Raju acted in a spy role which is parallel to James Bond.

Cast
Krishnam Raju as spy
Latha Sethupathi
Mohan Babu

Soundtrack 
The film features music composed by Sathyan. Lyrics by Veturi, C. Narayana Reddy and Aarudra.
"Chikkadapalli Chinadhana" - P. Susheela
"Yemani Cheppedi" - S. Janaki
"Ee Kode Vayasu" - S. Janaki
"Ee Santaloo" - S. Janaki, Chorus

References

External links

1979 films
Indian spy thriller films
Indian spy action films
Indian detective films
1970s spy thriller films
1970s spy action films
Telugu remakes of Hindi films
Films scored by Satyam (composer)
1970s Telugu-language films
Films directed by S. D. Lal